Samuel W Hill, (November 6, 1815 – August 28, 1889) was an American surveyor, geologist and mining developer in Michigan's Copper Country.

Early life and experience 
Samuel Worth Hill was born on November 9
, 1815 in Starksboro, Vermont to Richard and Betsey Hill.  He was educated in a Friends school, and was trained as a civil engineer and a surveyor.  His first assignment was to survey the town of Albion, New York.  In 1840, he moved to Milwaukee, and became a school teacher in Racine. In 1841, Hill secured a position with the United States Topographical Survey, and undertook an expedition to mark the boundary line between Wisconsin and Michigan.  He was then assigned to survey the western Upper Peninsula, including the Keweenaw Peninsula.  In the fall of 1841, Hill returned to Racine and became a school superintendent until his appointment to survey the Upper Peninsula.

Copper Country 
Samuel W. Hill worked with Douglass Houghton in his lineal and geological survey of the Upper Peninsula.  After Houghton died in 1845, Hill worked with Foster & Whitney to conduct a geological study the copper region.  He discovered the value of the area's copper resources and organized the first mining companies, and later served as agent for the Quincy Mining Company. In 1859, Hill platted the village of Hancock, then in Portage Township.  Hill also conceived of the idea of constructing a three-mile-long canal between Portage Lake and Lake Superior to transport freight to and from the copper mines.  Hill assisted in organizing the Central and Phoenix mines and was the first president of Copper Falls.  Later, Hill tried to develop the copper resources of Isle Royale around Siskiwit Bay.

What in Sam Hill? 
Samuel W Hill's propensity for profanity was legendary.  Whenever his friends and neighbors would retell his colorful tales, they would substitute "Sam Hill" for the cuss words.  Eventually, the phrase "What in Sam Hill?" spread beyond the Keweenaw Peninsula to become part of the American language.

Legacy 
Samuel W. Hill married Susan A. Warren, July 16, 1851.  Miss Warren was a pioneer school teacher in the Upper Peninsula, and established the first school in the Keweenaw region.  The Hills were to make their home in Marshall, Michigan.  Hill later served in the Michigan legislature, being twice elected.

Footnotes

Bibliography

Related Links 

 Elliott, Paul J. "If these stones could talk." Blog, 5 October 2012.
 History of the Upper Peninsula of Michigan, Houghton County
 

1815 births
1889 deaths
People from Starksboro, Vermont
American surveyors
American mining engineers